Petr Janda (born 5 January 1987) is a Czech retired football player. He was also a regular for the Czech Republic national under-21 football team.

Career

Club career
Janda joined Antalyaspor on a 3.5 year contract on 28 January 2012.

In 2020, he moved to TJ Blatná after a few years at TJ Sokol Čížová, where he also functioned as an assistant coach. He left Blatná in the summer of 2020.

Honours
Czech Rupublic U-21
 FIFA U-20 World Cup runner-up (1) 2007

References

External links
 

1987 births
Living people
Czech footballers
Czech expatriate footballers
Czech Republic youth international footballers
Czech Republic under-21 international footballers
Czech Republic international footballers
Czech First League players
Süper Lig players
TFF First League players
SK Slavia Prague players
Antalyaspor footballers
Denizlispor footballers
Boluspor footballers
Association football midfielders
Czech expatriate sportspeople in Turkey
Expatriate footballers in Turkey
People from Čáslav
Sportspeople from the Central Bohemian Region